Travis Steven Mack (born April 15, 1983) is an American NASCAR crew chief who is currently employed at Trackhouse Racing Team. He is currently the crew chief for the No. 99 Chevrolet Camaro ZL1 in the NASCAR Cup Series that is driven by Daniel Suárez. Prior to Trackhouse, Mack was the crew chief of the No. 1 JR Motorsports Chevrolet Camaro driven by Michael Annett in the NASCAR Xfinity Series for the 2019 and 2020 seasons and was also the crew chief of the No. 95 Chevrolet Camaro at Leavine Family Racing in 2018.

Mack began his career as a mechanic on Frank Kimmel's ARCA team before joining Hendrick Motorsports in 2004 as a shock specialist and front-end mechanic. He was named car chief at JR Motorsports in 2013, working on the No. 7 car of Regan Smith, and was reassigned in 2014 as the car chief of the No. 9 car, where he was a part of Chase Elliott's championship-winning team. He rejoined Hendrick Motorsports in 2015 as the car chief for Dale Earnhardt Jr., serving as Earnhardt Jr.'s crew chief for one race in 2017.

References

External links 
 Travis Mack crew chief statistics at Racing-Reference

1983 births
Living people
Sportspeople from Louisville, Kentucky
NASCAR crew chiefs